"Sail" is a song by the American rock band Awolnation. It was released as a single on November 8, 2010. The song was first featured on the band's debut extended play, Back from Earth (2010), and was later featured on their debut album, Megalithic Symphony (2011). The song was written and produced in Venice, California by group member Aaron Bruno, with Kenny Carkeet as audio engineer.

"Sail" is the band's most commercially successful song to date. It debuted at number 89 on the United States Billboard Hot 100 chart in September 2011, spending 20 weeks on the chart before dropping out. The single re-entered the Hot 100 a year later, becoming a massive sleeper hit and reaching a new peak of number 17. "Sail" is the first song to climb to its peak after a year on the Hot 100. It spent the fourth-longest amount of time on the Billboard Hot 100 chart with 79 weeks behind only the Weeknd's "Blinding Lights" (90 weeks), Imagine Dragons' "Radioactive" (87 weeks) and the Glass Animals hit ”Heat Waves” (91 weeks). As of October 2022, the song has accumulated more than 700 million streams on Spotify.

Background and composition
"Sail" is an electronic rock and alternative rock song. It has also been noted as featuring "industrial-tinged electropop". While band frontman Aaron Bruno has never come out and spoken directly concerning what "Sail" is about, in a 2016 interview, he recalls contemplating that perhaps people needed a different, darker sort of song than some of the more happier ones that were on the radio stating, "I remember playing the song for a producer friend of mine, and he told me everything was great, but I needed a chorus."  Bruno then tried to write a chorus, but failed to achieve what he thought the song needed.

Music video
The video for "Sail" opens with lead singer Aaron Bruno running to a house. He enters the house relieved to have escaped from the threat outside. He shuts the blinds. Bruno then finds a tape recorder and starts singing into it. He enters a bathroom and looks into a mirror, still singing. A green strip of light enters the house and moves across it, scanning a spacesuit helmet and a military flight-suit. As the light climbs up the stairs towards him, Bruno hides inside a full bathtub. The beam scans him in the bath. Bruno is then depicted being pulled across the floor by an unknown force; he attempts to cling to a door-frame, but loses his grip. The scene is interspersed with shots of Bruno closing a door and playing the song's piano section. As the song's final chorus section begins, the house shakes. Lights and lamps turn on and off as gusts of wind blow. Bruno is pulled by the mysterious force outside the house, and he is subsequently levitated up into the sky as a set of floodlights flash on him. He drops the tape recorder.

A video recorded by YouTuber Nanalew has over 370 million views, in comparison to the group's own video which has just under 200 million. On January 28, 2015, Nanalew's video was blocked from YouTube due to copyright issues, but returned several days later. A few months later, Nanalew took the video down again herself. She wrote on her Facebook page, "For the last few years, Red Bull Records has been claiming all the earnings for the video. They'd agreed to work with me on a mutually beneficial partnership (including possible compensation for my video), but nothing has come through." The unofficial music video is back on Nanalew's original channel and the description has been revised.ddd

Commercial performance
In July 2010, Austin DJ Toby Ryan premiered the song on KROX-FM and the response from the listeners was positive.

"Sail" debuted at number 89 on the United States Billboard Hot 100 singles chart on the week of September 3, 2011. The single spent 20 weeks on the chart before dropping out following the issue date of January 14, 2012. It eventually re-entered in mid-2013; its use in various television shows and advertisements exposed the song to a wider audience. Following its appearance in a History Channel trailer promoting Vikings, weekly downloads "more than tripled". The song has since spent more than a year on the chart and peaked at number 17 on the Hot 100 in its fifty-sixth week on the chart, two years after its initial debut. "Sail" was certified triple platinum by the Recording Industry Association of America in June 2013, and as of May 2017, it has sold over 6.1 million copies in the US.

"Sail" also peaked at number five on the Billboard Alternative Songs chart in 2011. The song was featured in the introduction of the 2012 film Disconnect. Due to its extremely unusual longevity, it has become the only song in the history of the Hot 100 to spend a year on the chart without entering the top 20 first.

In Australia and New Zealand, the song peaked in September 2013, reaching number 27 on the Australian Music Chart, and number 33 on the New Zealand Music Chart. In the United Kingdom, the song peaked at number 17 on the UK Singles Chart in January 2014.

In an interview in late 2016, Bruno said that he has gotten used to the fact that "Sail" was able to sell so many copies, but for a while, he felt like he didn't deserve it. "Finally at a certain point, you realize 'well I did write the song', and I've become used to it to a certain degree, but more than anything I feel like sort of a messenger of some greater methods that was meant to be heard by people in general."

Covers, remixes and media appearances

Online
 "Sail" was used as the soundtrack for a YouTube video of proximity wingsuit flying "Grinding the Crack" by extreme athlete Jeb Corliss, uploaded in August 2011, which went viral, receiving in excess of 30 million views.

Movies
 "Sail" was featured in the 2012 film Disconnect, the 2012 horror movie Playback, and the 2014 sports drama When the Game Stands Tall. "Sail" was also featured in the 2016 horror film Incarnate.
"Sail" was featured in the 2019 romantic-comedy Always Be My Maybe.

TV
 Bravo TV used it to advertise for the reality show "Below the Deck" (2019)
 A BMW commercial that aired during the 2012 Summer Olympics incorporated "Sail".
The song was featured in a commercial by A1 Telekom Austria in 2015 and 2016.
 In 2013, the song was used by the TV channel History in a trailer for the show Vikings and in the trailer for The Counselor (2013).
 "Sail" was featured in "Whiskey Tango Foxtrot", the ninth episode of the third season of The Good Wife.
 A So You Think You Can Dance contestant danced to it in May 2012.
 "Sail" was featured in "The Walking Dead", the twenty-second episode of season four of The Vampire Diaries.
 "Sail" was played during the final scene of "Dog Soldier", the fifth episode (season one) of A&E's crime drama Longmire.
 "Sail" was the soundtrack to the season highlights video of the Orange Emus rugby club's premiership win in 2016.
 A brief excerpt of "Sail" was used in Fleabag, the second episode (season 1), a BBC comedy and drama in 2016.
 "Sail" was used in the eighteenth episode of the fourth season of Pretty Little Liars, in 2014.
 "Sail" is played by the marching band of East Mississippi Community College in the Netflix documentary series Last Chance U.

Music
The song was officially remixed by West Coast rappers Kendrick Lamar and Ab-Soul of Black Hippy, courtesy of Top Dawg Entertainment (TDE). The song can be found on Megalithic Symphony (Deluxe Version) and was dubbed the “TDE remix”.
 Rapper Machine Gun Kelly heavily sampled the song to create his own single, "Sail".
 Australian artist Ash Grunwald covered the song on his 2012 album, Trouble's Door.
 Heavy metal band DevilDriver covered the song in 2013 for their album Winter Kills.
 Singer Macy Gray covered the song on her 2012 album Covered. A "Bonus Track Version" of the album features the Dirty Plastic Hits Remix of the cover which samples Aaron Bruno's vocals from the original.

Video games
 Game developer Valve's video game Counter-Strike: Global Offensive allows you to purchase a "Music Kit" containing portions of Awolnation's music, including "Sail".
 A remix of "Sail" by LED was featured in the soundtrack of EA Sports UFC.
 "Sail" as well as a few other tracks made by the band were included as a limited music theme option in Smite.

Sport
 "Sail" has been used as the walk-out music for Sale Sharks in their home rugby matches.
 "Sail" has been used by Red Bull in intro and advertising video for their "Red Bull Signature Series".

Formats and track listings
 Digital download (United States)
 "Sail" – 4:19
 "Sail" (Innerpartysystem Remix) – 5:26
 "Sail" (Dan the Automator Remix) – 4:34
 "Sail" (Unlimited Gravity Remix) – 5:49

Charts

Weekly charts

Year-end charts

Decade-end charts

Certifications

Release history

References

External links
Music video

2010 songs
2010 debut singles
2010s ballads
Rock ballads
Synth-pop ballads
Awolnation songs
Songs about suicide
Songs written by Aaron Bruno
Red Bull Records singles